The Men's discus throw F42/44 at the 2014 Commonwealth Games as part of the athletics programme was held at Hampden Park on 28 July 2014.

WR World Record, GR Commonwealth Games Record, SB Season Best, PB Personal Best, DNS Did not start, DQ Disqualified, DNF Did not finish, AR Area Record

References

Men's discus throw F42 44
2014